Henry Edmund Machold (July 5, 1880 in Amsterdam, Montgomery County, New York – February 6, 1967) was an American lawyer, businessman and politician.

Life
He was the son of P. Bernhard Machold and Margaret Mellmen Machold. He attended Albany Law School and read law in Amsterdam. During the Spanish–American War he served in the New York State Militia. He began operating a dairy farm in Ellisburg, New York in 1900. He married Jennie Ward, and they had twins, Earl and Doris. He also engaged in banking from 1919 on, eventually becoming president of the Northern New York Trust Company.

He was a member of the New York State Assembly in 1912, 1913, 1914, 1915, 1916, 1917, 1918, 1919, 1920, 1921, 1922, 1923 and 1924; and was Speaker from 1921 to 1924. As Speaker, he advocated lowering taxes and successfully opposed Governor Al Smith's attempts to reorganize the state bureaucracy.

He was a delegate to the Republican National Convention in 1924 and 1932. He was Chairman of the New York Republican State Committee in 1928 and 1929, campaigning for Herbert Hoover.

He was vice-president of the St. Regis Paper Company and the Niagara Mohawk Power Company (1932–1950). In 1934, he was accused of trying to influence state legislation concerning utilities.

He was a presidential elector in 1952 and 1956, voting both times for Dwight D. Eisenhower and Richard Nixon.

He was buried at Ellisburg Cemetery in Ellisburg, N.Y.

References

Sources
 Edmund Machold, Utilities Aide and ex-G.O.P. Leader, Is Dead in NYT on February 8, 1967
 Bio 
 New York Times: Election to his first term as Speaker, in NYT on January 6, 1921
 Machold ancestry, at Schenectady history

1880 births
1967 deaths
Speakers of the New York State Assembly
Republican Party members of the New York State Assembly
1952 United States presidential electors
1956 United States presidential electors
American bankers
Albany Law School alumni
People from Amsterdam, New York
People from Ellisburg, New York
20th-century American politicians